is a junction passenger railway station located in the city of Sakaide, Kagawa Prefecture, Japan. It is operated by JR Shikoku and has the station number "Y06".

Lines
Kamogawa Station is served by the JR Shikoku Yosan Line and is located 16.6 km from the beginning of the line at Takamatsu. Yosan line local, Rapid Sunport, and Nanpū Relay services stop at the station. These trains also stop at Kamogawa.

Layout
The station consists of two island platforms serving four tracks. A concrete station building by the side of the tracks is unstaffed and serves only as a waiting room. Access to the island platforms is by means of a footbridge. In addition there is a siding serving a disused freight platform.

Adjacent stations

History
After the railway as nationalized on 1 December 1906, Japanese Government Railways (JGR) took over the station and operated it as part of the Sanuki Line (later the Sanyo and then the Yosan Main Line). With the privatization of Japanese National Railways (JNR, the successor of JGR) on 1 April 1987, control of the station passed to JR Shikoku.

Surrounding area
Japan National Route 11

See also
 List of railway stations in Japan

References

External links

Station timetable

Railway stations in Kagawa Prefecture
Railway stations in Japan opened in 1897
Sakaide, Kagawa